Baranivka (Baranivke) is a town in Zviahel Raion in the Zhytomyr Oblast of Ukraine. Prior to the 2020 administrative reform, it was the administrative centre of the former Baranivka Raion. Population: . In 2001 the population was 12,584.

The name, from the old Slavic language. means swamp, and from eastern Slavic, -- a ram of ovis. The Slavic meaning of the word is given not coincidentally as the town is located in close proximity to the Prypiat Marshes.

In Zhytomyr Oblast, between Zviahel and Korosten, there is another small town of Barashi, about 50 km northeast from Baranivka.

References

Cities in Zhytomyr Oblast
Cities of district significance in Ukraine
Volhynian Voivodeship (1569–1795)
Novograd-Volynsky Uyezd
Zviahel Raion
Shtetls